Masarpatti is a small village located 14 km from Sattur, Thoothukudi District, Tamil Nadu, India.

External links 
 Masarpatti Pin Codes Search - Sulekha.com

Villages in Thoothukudi district
Thoothukudi